Yoram Dinstein (יורם דינשטיין; born January 2, 1936) is an Israeli scholar and Professor Emeritus at Tel Aviv University. He is a specialist on international law, and a prominent authority on the laws of war. He served as President of Tel Aviv University from 1991 to 1998. Won the 2023 Israel prize for law research.

Biography
Yoram Dinstein was born in Tel Aviv in 1936. He received his legal education from Hebrew University of Jerusalem, where he graduated summa cum laude, and New York University Law School.

Legal and academic career
Dinstein was appointed an instructor at the Hebrew University in 1964. From 1966 to 1970, he was a member of the Israeli delegation to the United Nations and the Israeli Consul-General in New York City.

Dinstein was Dean of the Faculty Law at Tel Aviv University from 1978 to 1980. From 1980 to 1985 he was the Rector of Tel Aviv University (1980–85), and he served as its president from 1991 to 1998 (following Moshe Many, and succeeded by Itamar Rabinovich).

He served twice as the Charles H. Stockton Professor of International Law at the U.S. Naval War College in Newport, Rhode Island, from 1999 to 2000 and again from 2002 to 2003. He was also a Humboldt Fellow at the Max Planck Institute for Comparative Public Law and International Law in Heidelberg, Germany, a Meltzer Visiting Professor of Law at New York University, and a visiting Professor of Law at the University of Toronto.

Dinstein is President of Israel's national branch of the International Law Association and of the Israel United Nations Association. He served as Chairman of the Israel national branch of Amnesty International and as a member of the Executive Council of the American Society of International Law. He is a member of the Council of the San Remo International Institute of Humanitarian Law. He is the founder and Editor of the Israel Yearbook on Human Rights (40 volumes of which have been issued – in English – since 1971). During his time at Amnesty International, Israeli government funded its operation, and Dinstein regularly was in  contact with the Israeli Foreign Ministry and received instructions from it.

Dinstein has written on international law, human rights, and the laws of armed conflict.

Selected published works

Books
The Conduct of Hostilities Under the Law of International Armed Conflict, Cambridge University Press (2nd ed., 2010)The International Law of Belligerent Occupation, Cambridge University Press,  (2009)War, Aggression and Self-Defence, Cambridge University Press,  (4th ed., 2005) (5th ed., 2011)War crimes in international law, co-editor with Mala Tabory, Martinus Nijhoff Publishers,  (1996)Freedom of Religion and the Protection of Religious Minorities, The Jacob Blaustein Institute for the Advancement of Human Rights (1991)The Release of Prisoners of War, International Committee of the Red Cross (1984)Models of Autonomy, Transaction Publishers,  (1981)The Laws of War at Sea,  (1980)The Defence of "Obedience to Superior Orders" in International Law, A. W. Sijthoff (1965)

Articles
"Air and Missile Warfare Under International Humanitarian Law", The Military Law and the Law of War Review. (2013)
"Comments on Protocol I}, International Review of the Red Cross (2010)
"War, Aggression and Self-Defence", Commonwealth Law Bulletin, Volume 32, Issue 4 (December 2006)
"Comments on War", Harvard Journal of Law and Public Policy (2003)
"The Parameters and Context of International Criminal Law", Touro Journal of  Transnational Law (1988)
"International Criminal Law", The Israel Law Review (1985)
"Oil pollution by ships and freedom of the high seas", Journal of Maritime Law & Com.'' (1971)

References

New York University School of Law alumni
Academic staff of Tel Aviv University
Israeli Jews
Israeli lawyers
Living people
Naval War College faculty
New York University faculty
Academic staff of the University of Toronto
Amnesty International people
Max Planck Institute for Comparative Public Law and International Law people
Deans of law schools in Israel
International law scholars
Israeli academic administrators
1936 births
Presidents of universities in Israel
Charles H. Stockton Professors of International Law
Members of the Institut de Droit International